Bertram Arthur "Jimmy" James, MC, RAF (17 April 1915 – 18 January 2008) was a British survivor of The Great Escape. He was an officer of the Royal Air Force, ultimately reaching (some years after the Great Escape) the rank of Squadron Leader.

Early life
James was born in India, the son of a tea-planter, Herbert Mark James (son of Canon Mark James) and his wife Elizabeth Isabella Loosemore. James was educated at The King's School, Canterbury. Returning to London following his mother's death, James and his father started a tea importing business that suffered from the 1930s economic downturn and ultimately failed. Soon after, his father died of pneumonia which left Jimmy alone. Recalling that he had relatives in the United States, he worked his passage on a coal ship across the Atlantic, often acting as pilot due to the drunken nature of the crew. Upon arrival, he soon realised that his relatives were also suffering due to the Great Depression that was sweeping across the US. He thus decided to head north. With little more than the clothes he wore, Jimmy rode the cattle cars across the plains of middle America. This journey left a deep and enduring impact upon the young Jimmy and, after hooking up with a small band of hobos, he learnt to live as an itinerant. Eventually, Jimmy arrived in Canada, again to meet up with cousins. Work was scarce, but he managed to find a job acting as a security guard in a local bank. "They gave me a gun and told me to watch the door. If anyone came through it, I was to shoot them", Jimmy recalled to his great friend, Howard Tuck. He worked in British Columbia from 1934 until volunteering for pilot training with the RAF in 1939 after seeing a recruiting poster in Vancouver. Taking another ship back to the UK, Jimmy soon found himself at the Air Force selection board in London before heading off for IOT (initial officer training).

Military career
James was initially commissioned as an acting pilot officer, and was promoted to pilot officer (on probation) on 9 December 1939. That rank was confirmed on 28 February 1941 (back-dated to 1 May 1940) when he was also promoted to war substantive flying officer with effect from 9 December 1940.

James was posted to No. 9 Squadron RAF at RAF Honington in April 1940 after completing his flying training. He was a second pilot of a Wellington bomber when he was shot down over the Netherlands on 5 June 1940 and he was then taken prisoner.

Prisoner of war

Following initial interrogation, James and a small band of others were taken to Berlin and paraded through the capital. "It was a rather ghastly affair really. They weren't hostile, as the bombing hadn't really started, but we were rather curious to them, I suppose". From Berlin, James was moved to the notoriously bleak Stalag Luft I at Barth on the northern coast of Germany. The camp was still under construction at this stage of the war and the reality was that the Germans were only slowly coming to terms with POWs. Within a matter of days, Jimmy and W/Cdr John 'Death' Shore were planning an escape - the route was to be via the camp incinerator. Digging a highly audacious tunnel, John Shore managed to clear the wire and escape, whilst Jimmy was caught in the act and sent directly to the cooler.

Over the next five years, he made thirteen efforts to escape from various prisons and camps, including Stalag Luft III, the site in March 1944 of the so-called Great Escape. A central figure in the story of the Great Escape, Jimmy James, together with Peter Fanshawe, was largely responsible for depositing the soil from Tunnel Harry under seat 13 in the camp theatre (built by prisoners). On the night of the escape, 24 March 1944, James and his partner, Pilot Officer Sotirios (Nick) Skantzikas, were disguised as Yugoslav workers trying to get home. Known as the 'hardarsers' group, they and others made their way south from the camp to the tiny rail stop at Tschiebsdorf (now Trzebów) about 8 km south of Sagan. After a treacherous night of walking through deep snow to reach Hirschberg, James and Skantzikas eventually found their way to Hirschberg West station and, attempting to purchase a ticket south, the two were arrested by the Criminal Police (Kripo) and taken to the Gestapo HQ in the town. Following a transfer to the local prison, Skanzikas was taken out to be shot, whilst James remained in his cell totally unaware of why he was saved from execution.

In Berlin, SS-Gruppenführer Nebe was ordered by Heinrich Müller, Chief of the Gestapo, to select and kill fifty of the seventy-three recaptured prisoners in what became known as the "Stalag Luft III murders". Fifty were then executed, James being one of a handful sent instead to the Sachsenhausen concentration camp. On 23 September 1944, James escaped from Sachsenhausen, accompanied by Jack Churchill, Harry Day, Johnnie Dodge and Sydney Dowse using small cutlery knives to dig an escape tunnel over 110 metres long. On the run for several weeks, he was finally arrested in Pomerania before being transferred back to solitary confinement in Sachsenhausen. James's cell was tiny, just enough to stand up and stretch. For over 4 months Jimmy James suffered daily harassment from the guards, mock executions and, of course, virtually no food. As the Red Army was approaching, the SS decided to move the Prominenten prisoners further south, possibly to act as a bargaining chip with the Allies - though this has never been confirmed. Following a torturous journey via Dachau and Flossenbürg concentration camps, James and other Prominenten were moved to the South Tyrol where they were eventually liberated by partisans and US Army troops in May 1945.

Awards

At the end of the war he was awarded the Military Cross (MC) and Mentioned in Despatches for his repeated escape attempts.  The citation for his MC was published in a supplement to the London Gazette of 14 May 1946 (dated 17 May 1946) and read:

Post-war RAF career
After the war, James was initially transferred to the reserve, but retained on active service, but was later granted a regular commission in the RAF (though in a non-flying role). On 9 December 1952, he transferred to the RAF Regiment, and retired as a squadron leader on 11 June 1958.

Later life
James married shortly after the war to a nurse, Madge, he met in an Officers Club at Vlotho in Germany. Their honeymoon was in itself a remarkable journey as they drove to the far tip of Norway in a former German Army VW Beetle.

After a period working for the Intelligence Services in Berlin, Jimmy returned to the UK and was subsequently made General Secretary of the Great Britain-USSR Association, sponsored by the Foreign and Commonwealth Office, until joining the Diplomatic Service in 1964. He subsequently held posts in Africa, Western and Eastern Europe and London. After retiring in 1975, he visited Sachsenhausen with Jack Churchill and other survivors of the camp. In 2008, James and historian Howard Tuck pioneered a project to build a replica barrack at the former site of Stalag Luft 3 in Poland (formerly part of Germany). James was also a well known public speaker, touring the country and overseas to recount his wartime experiences. As a stalwart of the RAF Ex-Prisoners of War Association, James was a regular visitor to RAF Stations where he would host presentations and talk to all ranks about the lessons of captivity. He served as the British representative on the International Sachsenhausen Committee until shortly before his death at the age of 92 at the Royal Shrewsbury Hospital on 18 January 2008.

His funeral was held at St Peter's Catholic Church, Ludlow on 31 January 2008.  A party of RAF Regiment gunners from RAF Honington served as pallbearers. Other personnel from the Defence College of Aeronautical Engineering at Cosford were also present, as was Air Commodore Bob McAlpine, a former CO of No. 9 Squadron.  Hundreds of local people from Ludlow lined the procession route to pay their respects to the great war hero as four Tornado GR4s of 9 Squadron (Jimmy's former squadron) performed a flypast in the missing man formation. Jimmy James wrote a fantastic account of his time as a prisoner of war in his book, "Moonless Night".

Bibliography

References

External links
BBC - 'Great Escape' war veteran dies
BBC - Escape veteran was 'true legend' 
BBC - RAF veteran visits Nazi war camp
BBC - Hitler ordered 'Great Escape' massacre
Obituary in The Times, 19 January 2008
'Moonless Night' by Squadron Leader Jimmy James

1915 births
2008 deaths
Royal Air Force officers
Royal Air Force personnel of World War II
British World War II pilots
British World War II bomber pilots
British World War II prisoners of war
World War II prisoners of war held by Germany
British escapees
Participants in the Great Escape from Stalag Luft III
People educated at The King's School, Canterbury
Recipients of the Military Cross
British diplomats
Sachsenhausen concentration camp survivors
Dachau concentration camp survivors
Flossenbürg concentration camp survivors
British people in colonial India